Council Bluffs Municipal Airport  is a public use airport located four nautical miles (5 mi, 7 km) east of the central business district of Council Bluffs, a city in Pottawattamie County, Iowa, United States. It is owned by Council Bluffs Airport Authority. This airport is included in the National Plan of Integrated Airport Systems for 2011–2015, which categorized it as a general aviation facility.

Flight school and air charter company Advanced Air Inc. operates out of this airport. The airport is also the site of Iowa Western Community College's Aviation Maintenance Technology program, and their Professional Pilot training program.

The airport has many instrument approaches, including an ILS to Runway 36, and a VOR-A approach that are both used regularly for training.

Facilities and aircraft 
Council Bluffs Municipal Airport covers an area of 656 acres (265 ha) at an elevation of 1,245 feet (379 m) above mean sea level. It has two runways with concrete surfaces: 18/36 is 5,500 by 100 feet (1,676 x 30 m) and 14/32 is 3,650 by 60 feet (1,113 x 18 m).

For the 12-month period ending March 22, 2012, the airport had 40,050 aircraft operations, an average of 109 per day: 96% general aviation, 4% air taxi, and <1% military. At that time there were 83 aircraft based at this airport: 63% single-engine, 14.5% multi-engine, 8% jet, and 14.5% helicopter.

References

External links
 Council Bluffs Airport Authority
 Advanced Air, the fixed-base operator (FBO)
 Aerial image as of March 1990 from USGS The National Map
 

Airports in Iowa
Buildings and structures in Council Bluffs, Iowa
Transportation buildings and structures in Pottawattamie County, Iowa